May Minamahal (English: 'Loving Someone') is a 1993 Filipino romantic comedy-drama film written and directed by Jose Javier Reyes. It was the first romantic drama film produced by Star Cinema, and its third film overall. Its rough translation in English is "Loving Someone". This is the first film where Aga Muhlach and Aiko Melendez were first paired up in a lead role.

The film was co-produced by Regal Films and also re-released on home video releases by Regal Home Video in 1994 and 2002, internationally. In 2007, it was adapted into a television series of the same name by ABS-CBN as the third installment of Sineserye Presents.

In 2018, the film was digitally restored and remastered in 4K high definition by ABS-CBN Film Restoration and L'Immagine Ritrovata. It was released on February 21, 2018, on cinema and December 1, 2019, on free-to-air television through the Restored Classics banner of ABS-CBN's Sunday late-night special presentation block Sunday's Best.

Synopsis 
May Minamahal tells the story of a romance between Carlitos Tagle, the only son of an all-female family, and Monica Fernandez, the only daughter of an all-male family as they faced many challenges during their relationships like the rift between Carlitos and his family for a girl, an argument regarding disapproval of Monica's influence over Carlitos by his family, and the responsibilities and obligations of Carlitos from both home and work where he has no allotted time for himself. The film highlights the romantic relationship faced with numerous problems to solve.

Plot
The film begins with the whole Tagle family preparing for a family picnic in Tagaytay but some moments later, a tragedy ensued when the family patriarch Ronald suffered a heart attack and died. After the funeral, they were condoled by their friends and family relatives for the death of Ronald, and Carlitos, the only son of the family, is now the patriarch of the family as told by their aunt Gloria when she comforted her sister Becky from the loss of her husband. Days after the funeral, Carlitos was joined by his workmates to eat lunch at the office's cafeteria and started meeting with the cafeteria's part-time worker Monica, who was initially offended by Carlitos' staring at her and she teased him, marking the beginning of a friendship. Back at home, Carlitos and his sisters Trina, Mandy, and Pinky are gathered together to discuss their finances and assets including the vehicles. Since Trina usually drives the family car due to her busy commitments at the advertising agency, the family decided to sell their family van despite the complaints from Mandy. Soon after, Carlitos began exchanging a short conversation with Monica, who was actually a college student and her father agreed to work with her aunt. Later, Carlitos became pressured by the problems involving the van being sold at a deficit price and his altercation with his younger sister Mandy for going home late from her boyfriend, leading to his mother Becky resolving the issues.

At the supermarket, while Carlitos is buying groceries, Monica shows up since she doesn't have classes on Monday, prompting Carlitos to invite her for a merienda after that. Monica agrees to join. Later at the fast-food restaurant, they eat and exchange stories together, particularly about topics that they are in common like sports and movies. At night, Carlitos returns home from Monica's car and promises to call her later on the telephone. As Monica returns home, she was scolded by her older brother Bombit due to her use of his car and she handles the cooking for dinner instead. A few moments later, Carlitos and Monica began exchanging stories on the telephone. The former was witnessed by his sisters while the latter was distracted from the loud rock music from Bombit, as warned by her other older brother Jun. On the following sunny day, the whole Tagle family is bonded together. Carlitos promised his mother that he would take care of all the obligations that their family had.

To see Monica, Carlitos began paying a visit to her household and he meets her family consisting of her father Cenon, older brothers Bombit and Jun, and cousin Didoy. He, along with Monica's whole family, began bonding together while eating lunch. On the night of their first date, Carlitos and Monica are at the fancy restaurant but they went to the delicious carinderia that serves delicious mami noodles instead as insisted by the latter. After a few days, his mother and three sisters began noticing Carlitos' new lifestyle including the use of cologne, suspecting that he has a girlfriend. At the family reunion of their relatives returning from overseas, Carlitos introduces Monica to his family. A few meetings later, Monica seriously asked Carlitos if he wants to be her boyfriend and he agreed, and the two became a couple.

As days pass, the relations between Carlitos and his family went sour when he began focusing on Monica and office work rather than on the obligations that their family needed to pay as well as time for bonding. While Carlitos and Monica spent their time in San Pablo, Becky was sent to the hospital but he almost made an argument with his sister Mandy about his time with his girlfriend. After a number of missed calls, Monica becomes disappointed and when Carlitos shows up, the two began a heated argument between each other.

In the end, Carlitos and Monica were finally married with their respective families being present to witness their ceremony.

Cast

Also starring 
 Alma Lerma as Geronilla (in TV series is Yvette)		
 George Lim as Tito Momoy
 Ernie Zarate as Tito Felix
 Teri Baylosis as Tito Manolo
 Fina Peralejo as Sandra
 Angie Roy as Atty. Caroline Pedrosa
 Alma Lerma as Manang Belen
 Paolo Zobel as Sammy
 Melvin Viceral as Spanky
 Leilani Terrobias as Susan, a half-American co-worker of Carlitos and his workmates
 Ed Murillo as Mr. Capili

Production and development 
May Minamahal began its development in early 1993 when Star Cinema, the film's producer and distributor, began its existence as a joint venture between ABS-CBN Broadcasting Corporation and Regal Films on May 8, 1993.

Casting
Aga Muhlach and Aiko Melendez previously appeared in the 1992 film, Sinungaling Mong Puso, before they were cast in the film. Muhlach previously worked with director Jose Javier Reyes through the 1992 MMFF entry Bakit Labis Kitang Mahal, where the latter served as the director.

May Minamahal is also the first Star Cinema project for Agot Isidro, Nikka Valencia, Boots Anson-Roa, and Claudine Barretto as well as the two cast members of ABS-CBN's then-youth variety show Ang TV: Fina Peralejo and Lailani Terrobias. Then-newcomer Isko Moreno, who began his prominence in the entertainment landscape in 1993, was cast as the high school-aged Carlitos and it served as his major break, alongside his hosting performances at GMA Network's variety show That's Entertainment.

Filming staff and crew
Few of the film's personnel and resources were from Regal Films as well as the filming unit itself.

Music
The film's theme song, May Minamahal, originally sung by Hajji Alejandro in 1977, was performed by Agot Isidro and composed by Willy Cruz.

Production credits

Writer and Director: Jose Javier Reyes
Producers: Charo Santos-Concio, Lily Y. Monteverde, Simon C. Ongpin
Studio Manager and Post-Production In-Charge (Regal Films): Warlito M. Teodoro
Line Producer: Joann Cabalda-Bañaga
Associate Producer: Grace Bersamin Beleno
Production Managers: Ed Castillo and Joel Apuyan
Music: Nonong Buencamino
Theme Song Composer: Willy Cruz
Theme Song Performer: Agot Isidro
Cinematography: Jun Pereira and Arnold Alvaro
Editor: George Jarlego
Sound Effects: Rodel Capule
Assistant Director: Crisanto Andrew Moreno
Production Designer: Benjie De Guzman
Dubbing Director: Lucy Quinto
Film Unit: Regal Films - Unit No. 3
Post-Production Facilities: Regal Films Inc.
Post-Production Coordinators: Mo-Dean Riggs, Edna Pacardo, Alie Sajorda, and Nora Reyes
Color Processing: LVN Pictures
Stills: Roper's Studio
Title Design: Cinemagic Inc.

Release 
The film was released by Star Cinema on December 25, 1993, as one of the entries for the 1993 Metro Manila Film Festival. It was opened to 42 movie theaters in the whole Metro Manila region and its neighboring provinces. This was Aga Muhlach's last Metro Manila Film Festival participation before he made his comeback in 2019 through the Philippine adaptation of Miracle in Cell No. 7 by Viva Films.

May Minamahal was also premiered in Japan on September 15, 1996, as part of the 1996 Fukuoka International Film Festival with Japanese and English subtitles. It was re-released again for exhibition on March 5, 1997.

Digital restoration 
The film's restored version was premiered on February 21, 2018, at Power Plant Mall - Cinema 1 in Makati, Metro Manila as part of the annual "Reelive the Classics" exhibition. The premiere was attended by the film's writer-director Joey Javier Reyes; cast members Boots Anson Roa-Rodrigo, Aiko Melendez, Aga Muhlach, Agot Isidro, Nikka Valencia, Ogie Diaz, Bimbo Bautista, and Malou Crisologo; line producer JoAnn Cabalda Bañaga; production assistant Gay Ace Domingo; and the family of producer Simon C. Ongpin.

Release dates

Television adaptation 

In 2007, May Minamahal was remade into a TV series by ABS-CBN and it is part of Sineserye Presents. The lead characters were Anne Curtis and Oyo Boy Sotto.

Reception

Legacy
May Minamahal is one of the Filipino films whose 35mm film prints were currently stored and preserved at the Fukuoka City Public Library Archives in Fukuoka City, Japan.

Accolades

References

Notes

External links 
 

Tagalog-language films
Philippine romantic drama films
1993 romantic drama films
Star Cinema films
1993 films